The women's relay at the 2016 UIPM Senior World Championships was held on 23 May 2016.

Results
Breakdown is as follows:

External links
Results

2016 World Modern Pentathlon Championships